Masuisuimatamaalii "Sua" Tauaua-Pauaraisa (born 30 October 1987) is a Samoan rugby league and rugby sevens footballer who played for the New Zealand Warriors in the NRL Women's Premiership. 

She is a New Zealand and Samoa representative in rugby league and a Samoa representative in rugby union and sevens.

Background
Born in Motoʻotua, Samoa, Tauaua-Pauaraisa moved to Auckland when she was 13, where she played rugby union for Tangaroa College. In 2010, she moved to Christchurch.

Playing career
In Christchurch, Tauaua-Pauaraisa played for Canterbury in the Farah Palmer Cup. In 2016, she began playing rugby league for the Linwood Keas.

On 4 June 2018, Tauaua-Pauaraisa was named in the New Zealand train-on squad.

On 31 July 2018, she signed with the New Zealand Warriors NRL Women's Premiership team. In Round 1 of the 2018 NRL Women's season, she made her debut for the Warriors in a 10–4 win over the Sydney Roosters.

On 13 October 2018, she made her Test debut for New Zealand in a 24–26 loss to Australia at Mt Smart Stadium.

In July 2019, she captained the Samoa rugby sevens team at the 2019 Pacific Games.

References

External links
NRL profile

1987 births
Living people
Samoan rugby union players
Samoan rugby league players
New Zealand female rugby league players
New Zealand women's national rugby league team players
Rugby league second-rows
Rugby league locks
New Zealand Warriors (NRLW) players
Samoa women's national rugby union team players
Samoa female rugby sevens players